Dream Girl is a 1948 comedy film directed by Mitchell Leisen, adapted from the 1945 play of the same name written by Elmer Rice. It stars Betty Hutton and Macdonald Carey.

Plot
A daydreamer, Georgie Allerton's imagination goes to work while she falls in love with her sister Miriam's husband-to-be, Jim Lucas. She closes her eyes and has a fantasy of what life with Jim would be like, ignoring the genuine attentions of Clark Redfield, an honest but poor newspaper reporter.

Jim goes through with the marriage to Miriam, which leaves Georgie considering an offer from suitor George Hand to go to Mexico with him. Another daydream begins, in which Georgie is now a singer in a tropical setting, killing herself after a tragic love affair.

Jim's publishing business and marriage go badly, resulting in a trip to Reno for a quick divorce. He actually has fallen for Georgie now, but this time, when her reverie results in her dreaming about a life on a ranch, Clark's wooing wins her over and she wakes up to realize she's in love.

Cast
 Betty Hutton as Georgiana Allerton
 Macdonald Carey as Clark Redfield
 Patric Knowles as Jim Lucas
 Virginia Field as Miriam Allerton Lucas
 Walter Abel as George Allerton
 Peggy Wood as Lucy Allerton
 Carolyn Butler as Claire Bleakley
 Lowell Gilmore as George Hand
 Zamah Cunningham as Mme. Kimmelhoff (music teacher)
 Frank Puglia as Antonio
 Georgia Backus as Edna
 Charles Meredith as Charles

References

External links
 

1948 films
Films scored by Victor Young
Films directed by Mitchell Leisen
American black-and-white films
American films based on plays
Paramount Pictures films
American comedy films
1948 comedy films
1940s American films